Nicholas K. Lory (born 29 March 1989) is a British film producer and cinematographer. He won an African Movie Academy Award and a Screen Nation Award for the 2016 film The Cursed Ones.

Nicholas K. Lory is the co-founder of Zissou Pictures Ltd. where he works as a producer.

Early life 
Nicholas K. Lory was born on 29 March 1989 in Oxford, England. He studied Philosophy and Psychology at Durham University and Social Anthropology at University of Oxford.

Awards and nominations

Publications 
Nicholas K. Lory is the author of the book On the accusation of negativity in Nietzsche’s ethics: A refutation (2012).

References

External links 
 

1989 births
British cinematographers
British film producers
Living people
Alumni of Durham University
Alumni of the University of Oxford
Best Cinematography Africa Movie Academy Award winners